Krasnogorsky District is an administrative and municipal district (raion), one of the thirty-six in Moscow Oblast, Russia. It is located in the center of the oblast. Its administrative center is the city of Krasnogorsk. Population:  149,679 (2002 Census);  The population of Krasnogorsk accounts for 65.0% of the district's total population.

Education

International School of Moscow maintains its Rosinka Campus in Rosinka, in the district.

References

Notes

Sources

 
Districts of Moscow Oblast